Malcolm Campbell High School was a high school in Montreal operated by the Protestant School Board of Greater Montreal and named after Malcolm A. Campbell, a Presbyterian minister who served as chairman of the school board for many years.

It opened September 1960.  The board voted in December 1986 to close the school. 

The building is now occupied by L'École Arménienne Sourp Hagop, a private school.

References

External links
Unofficial alumni website
Y2K Reunion Site
Malcolm Campbell High School Grads Facebook Group

High schools in Montreal
Defunct high schools